Geshnizgan may refer to:
 Geshnizgan, Chaharmahal and Bakhtiari
 Geshnizgan, Isfahan